The Battle of Balakot was fought between the forces of Maharaja Ranjit Singh and Syed Ahmad Barelvi in Balakot, Mansehra District on 6 May 1831. Barelvi declared jihad against the Sikhs and established a camp in Balakot. Along with Shah Ismail Dehlvi and his tribesmen, he attacked the Sikhs at dawn. The battle lasted all day. The Sikh soldiers eventually killed Syed Ahmad Barelvi, and hundreds of his followers were killed.

Battle 
On 6 May 1831, Syed Ahmad Barelvi's Mujahideen forces prepared for the final battle at Balakot in the mountainous valley of Mansehra. Sikh troops started landing at Balakot from Metikot Hill while Syed Ahmad and most of the Mujahideen forces were staying in and around the Masjid-E-Bala. The Mujahideen force was encamped far along the Satban waterfall. The Sikhs had warned Syed Ahmed that they would execute him and his followers if they didn't retreat, to which Syed Ahmed refused to surrender. Syed Ahmad suddenly left Masjid-E-Bala to ambush the Sikhs and reached Masjid-E-Yarin. Then he marched towards the foot of Metikot Hill with the Mujahideen forces. Every inch of Tiller in Metikot Hill was quickly filled by Sikh troops. 

Syed Ahmad was at the forefront of the Mujahideen forces but he turned back after some Islamic warriors were left behind. Suddenly, he was killed in the fountain of Metikot Hill and was beheaded by the Nihangs who took his head as a trophy which was a common practice done by soldiers in the Indian subcontinent at that time.

A large group of Mujahideen fighters did not realize that Syed Ahmad had been killed and went in search of him. Besides, small groups of Mujahideen were killed while fighting in different places. This battle lasted at least two hours. Then the Mujahideens started shouting loudly to different groups that Syed Ahmad had been taken to the top of the hill and told them all to come to the top of the hill. As a result, the Mujahideen moved towards the mountains to the north. When they reached the top of the mountains, they realized that they were surrounded. They tried to escape but were massacred and slain by Sikh soldiers coming from all sides of the hills and mountains. Thus, the deadly battle had come to an end. 

Another rumor about the death of Syed Ahmad is that he was at their vanguard and had infiltrated a group of Sikh soldiers. The peaks surrounded him which his followers did not notice. Thus he was killed but his body could not be identified by the Mujahideen. For this reason, even after a long time, the remaining Mujahideen could not believe that Syed Ahmad was dead. In the battle, Shah Ismail Dehlvi was also slain by the Sikh soldiers. Thus, the battle was a victory for the Sikhs who had now added Balakot to their empire and extended the western border of the Sikh Empire deep into Afghan territory which included Balakot and the whole of Mansehra District. After this major victory, the Sikhs turned their ambitions towards conquering Peshawar from the Afghans.

References

Battles involving the Sikhs
Conflicts in 1831
Syed Ahmad Barelvi